Guimard may refer to:

People
 Carlos Guimard, Argentinian chess grandmaster
 Cyrille Guimard, cyclist and commentator
 Gilles-Barnabé Guimard, French architect of the late 18th century
 Hector Guimard. French architect, popularizer of Art Nouveau
 Marie-Madeleine Guimard, French ballerina
 Paul Guimard, French writer

Places
 Hôtel Guimard, home of Marie-Madeleine Guimard
 Hôtel Guimard (Art Nouveau), home of Hector Guimard